Sosnowiec is a settlement in the administrative district of Gmina Gorzkowice, within Piotrków County, Łódź Voivodeship, in central Poland.

Also Refer
The Sielecki Castle was built in the 17th century and it is the oldest building in the city.

References

Villages in Piotrków County